Mikołaj Hieronim Sieniawski (1645–1683) was a Polish noble (szlachcic), military leader and politician.

Early life and family

He was the son of the starost of Lwów Adam Hieronim Sieniawski and Wiktoria Elżbieta Potocka, the daughter of Hetman Stanisław "Rewera" Potocki. He married in 1662 the daughter of Court and Grand Marshal Prince Aleksander Ludwik Radziwiłł, Princess Cecylia Maria Radziwiłł.

Military career and politics

He was Grand Guardian of the Crown since 1666, Great Chorąży of the Crown since 1668, Court Marshall of the Crown since 1676, starost of Lwów since 1679, voivode of Volhynian Voivodship since 1679, Field Crown Hetman since 1682 and starost of Radom, Rohatyn, and Piaseczno.

He became famous as a talented commander in wars against Cossacks and Tatars during the reign of King John II Casimir. In the rank of a Chorąży he took part, alongside John Sobieski, in the Chocim expedition.

He was Marshal of the Coronation Sejm between 2 and 14 March 1676 in Kraków.

Like his son Adam Mikołaj Sieniawski, he participated in the Vienna expedition of 1683. He died in the same year by contracting a disease, possibly syphilis, that spread after the battle.  

Mikolaj Hieronim
1645 births
1683 deaths
Field Crown Hetmans
Deaths from syphilis